The mitochondrial calcium uniporter (MCU) is a transmembrane protein that allows the passage of calcium ions from a cell's cytosol into mitochondria. Its activity is regulated by MICU1 and MICU2, which together with the MCU make up the mitochondrial calcium uniporter complex.

The MCU is one of the primary sources of mitochondria uptake of calcium, and flow is dependent on membrane potential of the inner mitochondrial membrane and the concentration of calcium in the cytosol relative to the concentration in the mitochondria. Balancing calcium concentration is necessary to increase the cell's energy supply and regulate cell death. Calcium is balanced through the MCU in conjunction with the sodium-calcium exchanger.

The MCU has a very low affinity for calcium, so the cytosolic calcium concentration needs to be approximately 5-10 uM for significant transport of calcium into the mitochondria. Mitochondria are closely associated with the endoplasmic reticulum (ER), at contact sites, which contains stores of cellular calcium ions for calcium signaling. The presence of 1,4,5-triphosphate (IP3) triggers the release of calcium from these intracellular stores, which creates microdomains of high calcium concentration between the ER and the mitochondria, creating the conditions for the MCU to take up calcium.

Ruthenium red and Ru360 are typical reagents used to experimentally block the MCU to study its properties and role in mitochondrial signaling.

MICU1 and MICU2

MICU1 
The mitochondrial calcium uptake 1 (MICU1) is a single pass membrane protein, it contains 2 binding domains. This protein was first discovered before the MCU by only a few months. MICU1 was used as a bait to figure out what the core of the mitochondrial calcium uniporter was. Once both MICU1 and MCU were discovered scientists made some intriguing discoveries in regards to the two proteins. Both MICU1 and MCU share similar RNA sequences, same pattern of expression, and they both interact with one another in the intermitochondrial  membrane. It was first found through the use of siRNA screening of the membrane. The functions of MICU1 are still being studied; however, there are some important functions MICU1 plays in the intermitochondrial  membrane. MICU1 helps to stabilize the entire mitochondrial calcium uniporter complex, it also limits the amount of calcium that enters the cell during low concentrations of calcium. However, along with limiting the entry of calcium into the mitochondrial matrix, it functions alongside MCU to keep the accumulated calcium inside the matrix of the mitochondria, and promotes ion specificity by preventing aberrant loading of transition metals into the mitochondria.

MICU2 
Mitochondrial calcium uptake 2 (MICU2) is another intermitochondrial membrane protein. It works alongside MICU1 and contains roughly 25% of the same DNA sequence. MICU2 works with MICU1 and MCU to reduce the amount of calcium coming into the matrix. It is shown that when both MICU1 and MICU2 are sequestered there is reduced calcium; however, whenever MICU1 is sequestered and MICU2 is activated, normal calcium flow. It is also shown that all three, MCU, MICU1, and MICU2 are part of a single complex, the mitochondrial calcium uniporter complex resumes. Research using a CRISPR/Cas9 technique has found that MICU1 and MICU2 play other roles as well. They are essential for cell growth, cell invasion, and cell replication.

References 

Transmembrane transporters
Calcium signaling
Mitochondria